The Switzerland national rugby sevens team is a minor national sevens side. It competes annually in the Rugby Europe sevens championship. For the 2022 season, the team played in the Rugby Europe Sevens Conference 1.

See also
Switzerland national rugby union team
Swiss Rugby Federation

References

S
Rugby union in Switzerland
National rugby sevens teams